Bloomfield Township is a township in Winneshiek County, Iowa, USA.

References

Townships in Winneshiek County, Iowa
Townships in Iowa